Alvark Tokyo is a Japanese professional basketball team located in Tokyo. The team, which is sponsored by Toyota, currently plays in the Japanese B.League.  Until 2000, the team was known as the Toyota Pacers. Founded as Toyota  Pacers in 1948, the club won two consecutive JBL Super League league titles in 2006 and 2007.

In July 2015, it was announced that the team would compete in the first division of the new Japan Professional Basketball League, which commenced from October 2016.

As of 2020, the team has been the reigning back-to-back champion of the B.League, Japan's top basketball league.

Honours

Domestic

B.League
Champions (2): 2018, 2019
National Basketball League
Runner-up (1): 2015
Japan Basketball League
Champions (1): 2011
JBL Super League
Champions (3): 2001, 2005, 2006
Runner-up (1): 2002
3rd place (1): 2004
Japan League Division I
Runner-up (1): 1996
3rd place (1): 1991

Continental
FIBA Asia Champions Cup
Champions (1): 2019
Runner-up (1): 2018

Players

Current roster

Notable players

Head coaches

 Shuji Ono: 2000–2005
 John Patrick: 2005–2006
 Torsten Loibl: 2006–2008
 Koju Munakata: 2008–2010
 Donald Beck: 2010–2015
 Takuma Ito: 2015–2017
 Luka Pavićević: 2017–2022
 Dainius Adomaitis: 2022–present

Practice facilities

They have their own gymnasium, Toyota Motors Fuchu Sports Center in Kitayamacho, Fuchu, Tokyo.

References

External links

Historical Finishes
Team Profile

 
Basketball teams in Japan
Basketball teams established in 1948
Sports teams in Tokyo
Toyota
1948 establishments in Japan